The Ketagalan Culture Center (KCC) is a cultural center in Beitou District, Taipei, Taiwan. The cultural center is dedicated to introduce the various plains indigenous cultures, including the Ketagalan tribes cultures.

History
The center was established in 2002. It underwent renovation in 2019.

Architecture
The center is housed in a 10-story building. It consists of exhibition areas, art gallery, conference room and classrooms.

Transportation
The cultural center is accessible within walking distance east from Xinbeitou Station of the Taipei Metro.

See also
 List of museums in Taiwan
 Taiwanese indigenous peoples

References

External links

 

2002 establishments in Taiwan
Cultural centers in Taipei
Event venues established in 2002